Mostafa Salari (born 1976 in Dasht-e Gur in Bushehr Province) is an Iranian politician who served as Head of Social Security Organization since 2019 to 2021. Salari served as  governor of Gilan from 2017 to 2019 and he served as governor of Bushehr Province from 2013 to 2017.

References

Living people
People from Bushehr Province
1976 births
Iranian governors
Moderation and Development Party politicians